The Gambia national women's cricket team is the team that represents The Gambia in international women's cricket. The team has played international cricket since 2015 and made its Twenty20 International (T20I) debut at the 2022 Nigeria Invitational Women's T20I Tournament.

History
In about 2007, the ICC Africa regional office mandated development programs for women's cricket. In 2008 the Gambia Cricket Association established a women's academy at July 22 Square in Banjul.

In 2015, Gambia hosted the inaugural North West Africa Cricket Council (NWACC) women's twenty20 tournament. In that competition, which was disrupted by the Western African Ebola virus epidemic, the national team finished runner-up to Sierra Leone, and recorded victories over both Ghana and Mali. The tournament matches were played at the Medical Research Centre (MRC) Ground in Bakau, even though it was reportedly in a poor condition.

Gambia also played at the 2016 edition of the tournament in Ghana.

In April 2018, the International Cricket Council (ICC) granted full Women's Twenty20 International (WT20I) status to all its members. Therefore, all Twenty20 matches played between Gambia women and other ICC members since 1 July 2018 have been full WT20Is. Gambia played their first official WT20I matches in March/April 2022 during the 2022 Nigeria Invitational Women's T20I Tournament.

Records and statistics

International Match Summary — Gambia Women
 
Last updated 2 April 2022

Twenty20 International

T20I record versus other nations

Records complete to WT20I #1050. Last updated 2 April 2022.

See also
 List of Gambia women Twenty20 International cricketers
 Gambia national cricket team

References

Women's
Women's national cricket teams
Cricket